In enzymology, a succinylglutamate desuccinylase is an enzyme that catalyzes the chemical reaction

N-succinyl-L-glutamate + H2O  succinate + L-glutamate

Thus, the two substrates of this enzyme are N-succinyl-L-glutamate and H2O, whereas its two products are succinate and L-glutamate.

This enzyme belongs to the family of hydrolases, those acting on carbon-nitrogen bonds other than peptide bonds, specifically in linear amides.  The systematic name of this enzyme class is N-succinyl-L-glutamate amidohydrolase. Other names in common use include N2-succinylglutamate desuccinylase, SGDS, and AstE.  This enzyme participates in arginine and proline metabolism.

References

 
 
 
 
 

EC 3.5.1
Enzymes of unknown structure